Wesley Douglas Teixeira Dias de Oliveira (born June 23, 1993), known as Douglas Dias or simply Douglas, is a Brazilian footballer who plays as a right back for Rio Branco de Venda Nova.

Career
Douglas began his footballing career on Santos FC's youth categories, and made his debut on 1 July 2012, against Portuguesa. He finished the year with three first-team appearances, also appearing on the bench during the 2012 Recopa Sudamericana winning campaign.

On 8 January 2014 Douglas joined Icasa, after his link with Santos expired. He was released in July, and joined Tombense in the following month.

Career statistics

Honours
Santos
 Recopa Sudamericana: 2012

Atlético Itapemirim
 Copa Espírito Santo: 2017

References

External links
 Santos FC profile 
 

1993 births
Living people
Brazilian footballers
Association football defenders
Campeonato Brasileiro Série A players
Campeonato Brasileiro Série B players
Campeonato Brasileiro Série C players
Campeonato Brasileiro Série D players
Santos FC players
Associação Desportiva Recreativa e Cultural Icasa players
Tombense Futebol Clube players
Tupi Football Club players
Itumbiara Esporte Clube players
Nacional Atlético Clube (SP) players
Oeste Futebol Clube players
Clube Atlético Penapolense players